Shabanlu (also Romanized as Sha‘bānlū) is a village in Angut-e Sharqi Rural District, Anguti District, Germi County, Ardabil Province, Iran. At the 2006 census, its population was 108, in 22 families.

References 

Towns and villages in Germi County